The Kia Pegas is an entry subcompact sedan (B-segment) manufactured in China by the Dongfeng Yueda Kia joint venture. It is sold under the Pegas nameplate in China, Africa and parts of the Middle East, and as the Kia Soluto in parts of Latin America and Southeast Asia.

Overview
The Kia Pegas made its debut at the 2017 Auto Shanghai. Based on the PB platform used in the Kia K2 and targeted at young buyers, the Pegas stands on a  wheelbase and has a trunk capacity of 475 liters. Powering the car is a 1.4 liter Kappa MPI I4 engine that generates 94 horsepower and 95 lb-ft torque to the front wheels.

The Pegas went on sale in August 2017 in China and in late 2018 in Egypt. It debuted in the Philippines on 30 January 2019 as the Kia Soluto, coinciding with Kia Motors Philippines' relaunch under Ayala Corporation ownership. The Soluto was released in Vietnam in September 2019. The Pegas/Soluto is also available in right-hand drive, which was released in Brunei on 18 September 2020 as the Soluto and in South Africa on 14 June 2021 as the Pegas.

Gallery

References

External links

 (China)
 (Philippines)

Cars introduced in 2017
Cars of China
Front-wheel-drive vehicles
Pegas
Subcompact cars